Benders is an American sitcom created by Tom Sellitti and Jim Serpico. On March 31, 2015, the series was ordered by IFC. The series premiered on IFC on October 1, 2015. On December 30, 2015, the series was canceled by IFC.

Premise
The series is centered on a group of guy friends whose lives revolve around their obsession for hockey. Even though they don't have the best skills, they have the passion to play in the local men's amateur hockey league. And they go through everyday life with problems that could impact their involvement on their team, "The Chubbys".

Cast

Main cast
Andrew Schulz as Paul Rosenberg
Lindsey Broad as Karen Rosenberg
Chris Distefano as Anthony Pucello
Mark Gessner as Dickie Litski
Ruy Iskandar as Sebalos

Recurring cast
Mark Margolis as Paul's Grandfather
Godfrey as Rajon Tucker
Steve Schirripa as Vito Gentile
Steve Greenstein as Dino 
Dan Amboyer as Christian
Meredith Hagner as Tanya 
Nneka Okafor as Angela 
Bianca Rutigliano as Kelly 
Alexis Suarez as Pedro

Notable guest stars
Jim Norton as Brian Beale
Dan Amboyer as Christian
Jim Breuer as Himself
Robert Kelly as EMT Thurber

Episodes

References

External links

2015 American television series debuts
2015 American television series endings
2010s American sitcoms
English-language television shows
Ice hockey television series
IFC (American TV channel) original programming